Frederick Thomas Fisher, (June 3, 1872 – April 15, 1906) was a gunner's mate in the United States Navy aboard  in 1899 during the Second Samoan Civil War. He received the Medal of Honor for his actions as part of the naval landing party during the Second Battle of Vailele on April 1, 1899.

Biography
Fisher was born June 3, 1872, in England and after immigrating to the United States he joined the U.S. Navy.

The authority for the award of the Medal of Honor was United States Navy General Order No. 55, July 19, 1901.

Medal of Honor citation
Rank and organization: Gunner's Mate First Class, U.S. Navy. Born: June 3, 1872, England. Accredited to: California. G.O. No.: 55, July 19, 1901.

Fisher's's official Medal of Honor citation reads:
Gunner's mate, first class, serving on board the U.S.S.Philadelphia, for distinguished conduct in the presence of the enemy at Samoa, April 1, 1899.Record of Medals of Honor given to bluejackets and Marines of the United States Navy 1862-1910, Government Printing Office, Washington, 1910, p. 31

Death and burial
Fisher's body was reinterred on November 17, 1906 in Angelus-Rosedale Cemetery, Los Angeles, California in Section K, Lot 84, Grave NE.

Fisher's reinterment notice in the November 19, 1906 Los Angeles, CA Times newspaper read:

BRAVE SAILOR AT REST. The remains of Frederick T. Fisher, chief gunner's mate of the United States warship Kearsarge, who was killed in the explosion on that vessel eight months ago, have been brought to Los Angeles, and were interred in Rosedale Cemetery on Saturday afternoon. The funeral services were private. His widow. Mrs. Inez M. Fisher, is residing at No. 1026 Temple street.

See also

List of Medal of Honor recipients

References

External links

1872 births
1906 deaths
English emigrants to the United States
American military personnel of the Philippine–American War
United States Navy Medal of Honor recipients
United States Navy sailors
English-born Medal of Honor recipients
Samoan Civil War recipients of the Medal of Honor